Miaoshan is a town in Laiwu District, Jinan, Shandong province, China. , it has 85 villages under its administration: 
Nanmiaoshan First Village
Nanmiaoshan Second Village
Nanmiaoshan Third Village
Nanmiaoshan Fourth Village
Beimiaoshan Village
Dongquan Village
Niuwangquan Village
Shiwan Village
Nanxinzhuang Village
Beixinzhuang Village
Nanzhujiawa Village
Beizhujiawa Village
Xiaoshanqian Village
Ganqiao Village
Xiaohoupo Village
Dahoupo Village
Shangguojiagou Village
Damanzi Village
Xiaomanzi Village
Shangzhujiadian Village
Chenjiayu Village
Gaoshangpo Village
Tangshangpo Village
Zhushangpo Village
Sushangpo Village
Xijianma Village
Lanzi Village
Yangjiazui Village
Nanliuzi Village
Beiliuzi Village
Douyu Village
Wangjiazhuang Village
Mengjiayu Village
Dongjianma Village
Dongshaoshan Village
Xishaoshan Village
Wuseya Village
Sunjiayu Village
Songjiayu Village
Hengshankou Village
Mandao Village
Huidui Village
Beilongjiao Village
Tianjialou Village
Shaoshanqian Village
Shangfangshan Village
Zhongfangshan Village
Nanfangshan Village
Beifangshan Village
Xiafangshan Village
Nanlongjiao Village
Wangjiaqiao Village
Shuiquanyu Village
Xiaguojiagou Village
Taohuayu Village
Shilongkou Village
Tongshan Village
Changjiazhuang Village
Wangjiahutong Village
Changzhuang Village
Shangzhou Village
Xiazhou Village
Xixing Village
Dongxing Village
Zhangjiazhuang Village
Gushan Village
Huangya Village
Gaotang Village
Zoujialanzi Village
Nanyu Village
Beiwei Village
Nanwei Village
Caiyu Village
Nanwenzi Village
Beiwenzi Village
Xigouya Village
Xiangshuiwan Village
Xipo Village
Taoyuan Village
Moshiyu Village
Nangudefan Village
Xigudefan Village
Beigudefan Village
Donggudefan Village
Luanjiazhuang Village

See also 
 List of township-level divisions of Shandong

References 

Township-level divisions of Shandong
Jinan